Aimé Fernand David Césaire (26 June 1913 – 17 April 2008) was a French poet, author, and politician. He was "one of the founders of the Négritude movement in Francophone literature" and coined the word  in French. He founded the Parti progressiste martiniquais in 1958, and served in the French National Assembly from 1945 to 1993 and as President of the Regional Council of Martinique from 1983 to 1988.

His works include the book-length poem Cahier d'un retour au pays natal (1939), Une Tempête, a response to Shakespeare's play The Tempest, and Discours sur le colonialisme (Discourse on Colonialism), an essay describing the strife between the colonizers and the colonized. His works have been translated into many languages.

Student, educator and poet

Aimé Césaire was born in Basse-Pointe, Martinique, French Carribbean, in 1913. His father was a tax inspector, and his mother was a dressmaker. He was a lower class citizen but still learned to read and write. His family moved to the capital of Martinique, Fort-de-France, in order for Césaire to attend the only secondary school on the island, Lycée Victor Schœlcher. He considered himself of Igbo descent from Nigeria, and considered his first name Aimé a retention of an Igbo name; though the name is of French origin, ultimately from the Old French word amée, meaning beloved, its pronunciation is similar to the Igbo , which forms the basis for many Igbo given names. Césaire traveled to Paris to attend the Lycée Louis-le-Grand on an educational scholarship. In Paris, he passed the entrance exam for the École Normale Supérieure in 1935 and created the literary review L'Étudiant noir (The Black Student) with Léopold Sédar Senghor and Léon Damas. Manifestos by these three students in its third number (May–June 1935) initiated the Négritude movement later substantial in both pan-Africanist theory and the actual decolonization of the French Empire in Africa. In 1934 Césaire was invited to the Kingdom of Yugoslavia by his friend Petar Guberina where in Šibenik he started writing his poem “Notebook of a Return to the Native Land”, which was one of the first expressions of the concept of Négritude. Upon returning home to Martinique in 1936, Césaire began work on his long poem Cahier d'un retour au pays natal (Notebook of a Return to the Native Land), a vivid and powerful depiction of the ambiguities of Caribbean life and culture in the New World.

Césaire married fellow Martinican student Suzanne Roussi in 1937. Together they moved back to Martinique in 1939 with their young son. Césaire became a teacher at the Lycée Schoelcher in Fort-de-France, where he taught Frantz Fanon, becoming a great influence for Fanon as both a mentor and contemporary. Césaire also served as an inspiration for, but did not teach, writer Édouard Glissant.

World War II

The years of World War II were ones of great intellectual activity for the Césaires. In 1941, Aimé Césaire and Suzanne Roussi founded the literary review Tropiques, with the help of other Martinican intellectuals such as René Ménil and Aristide Maugée, in order to challenge the cultural status quo and alienation that characterized Martinican identity at the time. In this sense, according to Ursula Heise, the publications of the French botanist Henri Stehlé in Tropiques in the early 1940's, concerning the Martinican flora, and "the invocations of Césaire to the Antillean ecology operate as indices of a racial and cultural authenticity which is distinguished from European identity...". During an interview granted in 1978, Césaire explains that his aim for including these articles in Tropiques was "to allow Martinique to refocus" and "to lead Martinicans to reflect" on their close environment. Césaire's many run-ins with censorship did not deter him, however, from being an outspoken defendant of Martinican identity. He also became close to French surrealist poet André Breton, who spent time in Martinique during the war. The two had met in 1940, and Breton later would champion Cesaire's work.

In 1947, his book-length poem Cahier d'un retour au pays natal, which had first appeared in the Parisian periodical Volontés in 1939 after rejection by a French book publisher, was published. The book mixes poetry and prose to express Césaire's thoughts on the cultural identity of black Africans in a colonial setting. Breton contributed a laudatory introduction to this 1947 edition, saying that the "poem is nothing less than the greatest lyrical monument of our times." When asked by René Depestre about his writing style, Césaire replied by saying that "Surrealism provided me with what I had been confusedly searching for."

Political career

In 1945, with the support of the French Communist Party (PCF), Césaire was elected mayor of Fort-de-France and deputy to the French National Assembly for Martinique. He managed to get a law addressing departmentalization approved unanimously on 19 March 1946. While departmentalization was implemented in 1946, the status did not bring many meaningful changes to the people of Martinique.

Like many left-wing intellectuals in 1930s and 1940s France, Césaire looked toward the Soviet Union as a source of progress, virtue, and human rights. He later grew disillusioned with the Soviet Union after the 1956 suppression of the Hungarian revolution. He announced his resignation from the PCF in a text entitled Lettre à Maurice Thorez (Letter to Maurice Thorez). In 1958 Césaire founded the Parti Progressiste Martiniquais. With the Parti Progressiste Martiniquais, he dominated the island’s political scene for the last half of the century. Césaire declined to renew his mandate as deputy in the National Assembly in 1993, after a 47-year continuous term.

His writings during this period reflect his passion for civic and social engagement. He wrote Discours sur le colonialisme (Discourse on Colonialism), a denunciation of European colonial racism, decadence, and hypocrisy that was republished in the French review Présence Africaine in 1955 (English translation 1957). In 1960, he published Toussaint Louverture, based on the life of the Haitian revolutionary. In 1969, he published the first version of Une Tempête, a radical adaptation of Shakespeare's play The Tempest for a black audience.

Césaire served as President of the Regional Council of Martinique from 1983 to 1988. He retired from politics in 2001.

Later life
In 2006, he refused to meet the leader of the Union for a Popular Movement (UMP), Nicolas Sarkozy, a probable contender at the time for the 2007 presidential election, because the UMP had voted for the 2005 French law on colonialism. This law required teachers and textbooks to "acknowledge and recognize in particular the positive role of the French presence abroad, especially in North Africa", a law considered by many as a eulogy to colonialism and French actions during the Algerian War. President Jacques Chirac finally had the controversial law repealed.

On 9 April 2008, Césaire had serious heart troubles and was admitted to Pierre Zobda Quitman hospital in Fort-de-France. He died on 17 April 2008.

Césaire was accorded the honor of a state funeral, held at the Stade de Dillon in Fort-de-France on 20 April. French President Nicolas Sarkozy was present but did not make a speech. The honor of making the funeral oration was left to his old friend Pierre Aliker, who had served for many years as deputy mayor under Césaire.

Legacy
Martinique's airport at Le Lamentin was renamed Martinique Aimé Césaire International Airport on 15 January 2007.
A national commemoration ceremony was held on 6 April 2011, as a plaque in Césaire's name was inaugurated in the Panthéon in Paris. He was also proclaimed as a national hero in Martinique.

Poetically, Césaire's legacy is far-reaching in poetry both from his time and beyond. Most notably, his relation to Frantz Fanon, famed author of Black Skin, White Masks, as mentor and inspiration is tangible. Fanon's personal testimony in Black Skin, White Masks explains the "liberating effect of Césaire’s word and action" that he felt in traversing the changing colonial landscape. More generally, Césaire's works conceptualized African unity and black culture in ways that allowed for the creation of black spaces where there previously were none, from the establishment of several literary journals to his reworking of Caliban's speech from Shakespeare's The Tempest. Césaire’s works were foundational for postcolonial literature across France, its then colonies, and much of the Caribbean.
In 2021, the Musée de l'Homme for its Portraits de France exhibition paid tribute to Aimé Césaire through a work by the artist Hom Nguyen.

Works

Each year links to its corresponding "[year] in poetry" article for poetry, or "[year] in literature" article for other works:

Poetry
 1939: Cahier d'un retour au pays natal, Paris: Volontés, .
 1946: Les armes miraculeuses, Paris: Gallimard, .
 1947: Cahier d'un retour au pays natal, Paris: Bordas, .
 1948: Soleil cou-coupé, Paris: K, .
 1950: Corps perdu, Paris: Fragrance, .
 1960: Ferrements, Paris: Editions du Seuil, .
 1961: Cadastre, Paris: Editions du Seuil, .
 1982: Moi, laminaire, Paris: Editions du Seuil, .
 1994: Comme un malentendu de salut ..., Paris: Editions du Seuil,

Theatre
 1958: Et les Chiens se taisaient, tragédie: arrangement théâtral. Paris: Présence Africaine; reprint: 1997.
 1963: La Tragédie du roi Christophe. Paris: Présence Africaine; reprint: 1993; The Tragedy of King Christophe, New York: Grove, 1969.
 1966: Une saison au Congo. Paris: Seuil; reprint: 2001; A Season in the Congo, New York, 1968 (a play about Patrice Lumumba).
 1969: Une Tempête, adapted from The Tempest by William Shakespeare: adaptation pour un théâtre nègre. Paris: Seuil; reprint: 1997; A Tempest, New York: Ubu repertory, 1986.

Other writings
 .
 . 
 .
 .

Discourse on Colonialism
Césaire's Discourse on Colonialism challenges the narrative of the colonizer and the colonized. This text criticizes the hypocrisy of justifying colonization with the equation "Christianity=civilized, paganism=savagery" comparing white colonizers to "savages". Césaire writes that "no one colonizes innocently, that no one colonizes with impunity either" concluding that "a  nation which colonizes, that a civilization which justifies colonization - and therefore force - is already a sick civilization".  He condemns the colonizers, saying that though the men may not be inherently bad, the practice of colonization ruins them.

Césaire's text intertwines slavery, imperialism, capitalism, republicanism, and modernism, stating that they were linked together and influenced one another in undeniable ways. Importantly, all of those oppressive forces came together to hurt the colonized and empower the colonizer. This position was considered radical at the time.

Césaire continues to deconstruct the colonizer, and ultimately concludes that by colonizing those white men often lose touch with who they were, and become brutalized into hidden instincts that result in the rape, torture, and race hatred that they put onto the people they colonize.  He also examines the effects colonialism has on the colonized, stating that "colonization = 'thing-ification'", where because the colonizers are able to "other" the colonized, they can justify the means by which they colonize.

The text also continuously references Nazism, blaming the barbarism of colonialism and how whitewashed and accepted the tradition, for Hitler's rise to power. He says that Hitler lives within and is the demon of  "the very distinguished, very humanistic, very Christian bourgeois of the twentieth century." Particularly, Césaire argues that Nazism was not an exception or singular event in European history; rather, the natural progression of a civilization that justified colonization without "perceiving the dangers involved in proceeding towards savagery." Césaire compared colonial violence to Nazism, arguing: "they tolerated that Nazism before it was inflicted on them, they absolved it, shut their eyes to it, legitimized it, because, until then, it had been applied only to non-European peoples."

Césaire's wishes for post-war Europe centered around decolonization, arguing that decolonization was the way forward for Europe out of "the binarism of capitalism/communism." Césaire believed that the only possible redemption for Europe’s dark path which had led to Nazism was through interactions with the "Third World". Decolonization offered an alternative to the dual negatives of capitalism and communism, employing pluralism as a way to usher in a new, more tolerant Europe. He was critical of neo-imperialism and US capitalism, and in many ways his fearful vision of the future has come to fruition today. Critiques of French universalism were also apparent in the text, particularly citing the issues that universalism caused for the departmentalization of Martinique of which Césaire was the main propagator. Departmentalization was an important goal for Césaire both in his texts and in his political career.

Césaire originally wrote his text in French in 1950, but later worked with Joan Pinkham to translate it to English. The translated version was published in 1972.

See also

 Créolité
 Antillanité
 Octave Mannoni

Notes

References

Bibliography

Books

 
  English translation from 1972 via Abahlali baseMjondolo.

Journal articles, book chapters, encyclopedia entries

 
 
  Translated as

News articles & web sources

External links

Aime Cesaire, biography, by Brooke Ritz, Postcolonial Studies website, English Department, Emory University, 1999.
Aimé Césaire, bibliography, biography, and links (in French), "île en île", City University of New York, 1998–2004.
 
Khalid Chraibi, an interview with Aimé Césaire, (in French) on occasion of the Paris première of "La Tragédie du Roi Christophe" in 1965.
Official tribute site to Aimé Césaire. 
"Out of Defeat: Aimé Césaire's Miraculous Words". Tribute by Colin Dayan, September/October 2008.
Aime Cesaire, 1913-2008: Remembering the Life and Legacy - video report by Democracy Now!, 21 April 2008.
Aimé Césaire, by Mabogo Percy More, May 2008.

1913 births
2008 deaths
20th-century French dramatists and playwrights
20th-century French essayists
20th-century French poets
20th-century male writers
Black French politicians
Communist poets
Communist writers
Deputies of the 1st National Assembly of the French Fifth Republic
Deputies of the 1st National Assembly of the French Fourth Republic
Deputies of the 2nd National Assembly of the French Fifth Republic
Deputies of the 2nd National Assembly of the French Fourth Republic
Deputies of the 3rd National Assembly of the French Fifth Republic
Deputies of the 3rd National Assembly of the French Fourth Republic
Deputies of the 4th National Assembly of the French Fifth Republic
Deputies of the 5th National Assembly of the French Fifth Republic
Deputies of the 6th National Assembly of the French Fifth Republic
Deputies of the 7th National Assembly of the French Fifth Republic
Deputies of the 8th National Assembly of the French Fifth Republic
Deputies of the 9th National Assembly of the French Fifth Republic
École Normale Supérieure alumni
French Communist Party politicians
French male poets
French people of Nigerian descent
Lycée Louis-le-Grand alumni
Martinican Progressive Party politicians
Martiniquais communists
Martiniquais dramatists and playwrights

Martiniquais poets
Martiniquais writers
Members of the Constituent Assembly of France (1945)
Members of the Constituent Assembly of France (1946)
People from Basse-Pointe
Presidents of the Regional Council of Martinique
Surrealist poets